Eivind Rekustad ( – 1 August 1992) was a Norwegian male former weightlifter, who competed in the 110 kg category and represented Norway at international competitions. He won the bronze medal in the press at the 1969 World Weightlifting Championships in the 110 kg category lifting 175.0 kg. He participated at the 1972 Summer Olympics in the 110 kg event.

References

External links
 

1948 births
1992 deaths
Norwegian male weightlifters
World Weightlifting Championships medalists
Sportspeople from Fredrikstad
Olympic weightlifters of Norway
Weightlifters at the 1972 Summer Olympics
20th-century Norwegian people